The 2011 Qatar Open, known as the 2011 Qatar ExxonMobil Open for sponsorship reasons, was a men's tennis tournament played on outdoor hard courts. It was the 19th edition of the Qatar Open, and part of the ATP World Tour 250 series of the 2011 ATP World Tour. It took place at the Khalifa International Tennis Complex in Doha, Qatar, from 3 January through 8 January 2011. Roger Federer won the singles title.

Finals

Singles

 Roger Federer defeated  Nikolay Davydenko, 6–3, 6–4

Doubles

 Marc López /  Rafael Nadal defeated  Daniele Bracciali /  Andreas Seppi, 6–3, 7–6(7–4)

Entrants

Seeds

 Rankings are as of December 27, 2010.

Other entrants
The following players received wildcards into the singles main draw:
  Sergei Bubka
  Reda El Amrani
  Sherif Sabry

The following players received entry from the qualifying draw:

  Marco Chiudinelli
  Lukáš Rosol
  Thomas Schoorel
  Antonio Veić

References

External links
 ATP tournament information
 ITF tournament edition details